The Carolina Thunderbirds were a professional ice hockey team located in Winston-Salem, North Carolina, United States.  The Thunderbirds played their home games at the old Winston-Salem Memorial Coliseum before the arena was demolished in 1989. The team played in the Atlantic Coast Hockey League from 1981 to 1987, the All-American Hockey League during 1987–88 and finally moved into the newly created East Coast Hockey League in 1988.

The Carolina Thunderbirds were one of five teams that played during the inaugural season of East Coast Hockey League (ECHL). The Thunderbirds won the first ever ECHL championship and were awarded the Riley Cup for the 1988–89 ECHL season.

The team changed its name to the Winston-Salem Thunderbirds before the start of 1989–90 season and the team remained in the ECHL until the end of the 1991–92 season when it was announced by co-owner Ed Broyhill that Winston-Salem would move to West Virginia to play as the Wheeling Thunderbirds.

Team history
The new franchise in Winston-Salem was awarded to a Cincinnati group headed by businessman Dave Gusky in 1981. The team was named the Winston-Salem Thunderbirds and were the second professional hockey team to be based in Winston-Salem, North Carolina, after the Winston-Salem Polar Twins, who played in the Southern Hockey League from 1973 to 1977. The Thunderbirds began in the inaugural 1981–82 season of the Atlantic Coast Hockey League (ACHL) and played their home games at the old Winston-Salem Memorial Coliseum, with capacity of 5,500 for hockey games. During the season, Gusky called recently retired former Buffalo Sabres' player Rick Dudley and asked for help with the struggling team. Dudley originally planned on staying for a few weeks to evaluate the team but realized the team would fold if he left. Dudley proposed that he would stay with the team and try to sell the franchise for Gusky and if that did not work, he would buy the team himself. After three of the seven teams had folded during the season, the league decided to end early and set the playoffs with the four remaining teams by geographical area to save on travel expenses. In their inaugural season, the team would finished 14–33–3 under head coach Curry Whittaker. The Salem Raiders defeated the Thunderbirds in five games in the playoffs.

After the first season, Dudley bought the team from Gusky and replaced Whittaker as the head coach. Dudley then rebranded the team as the Carolina Thunderbirds. Former Colorado Rockies player Dave Watson also joined the team and led the league in scoring with 102 points, 53 goals, and 49 assists. Starting in 1982 the team won four consecutive ACHL regular-season championships. The team improved to finish with a league-best 51–10–7 record in their second season. The team allowed only 208 goals (3.06 per game), the lowest per game average in team history, while also leading the league in scoring. Defenseman Rory Cava led the league with 60 assists during the season and was awarded with the ACHL Most Valuable Player (MVP) after the season. Watson and Michel Lanouette earned first team selections to the ACHL All-Star team, while Brian Carroll and Randy Irving had second team selections for their performances. Watson continued to lead the team in the postseason, leading the league in scoring with 14 points. They won their first Bob Payne Trophy, awarded to the playoff champion, in 1983 after defeating the Mohawk Valley Stars in four games, going 8–0 through the playoffs.

The following season, Watson was limited to 29 games during the regular season, but he was healthy again for the playoffs. Goaltender Pierre Hamel and Irving became first team selections to the ACHL All-Star team following the regular season. The Thunderbirds beat the Mohawk Valley Stars in the playoffs to return to the finals. In the finals, against the Erie Golden Blades, the Thunderbirds lost the championship in five games. Bill Coffey assumed team ownership from Rick Dudley in 1984. The team had their best regular season during the 1984–85 season with a 53–10–1 record with Watson again leading the team with 85 points. John Torchetti began his professional hockey career with the Thunderbirds, while Irving and Bob Hagan were named first team ACHL All-Stars for the season. After defeating the Virginia Lancers, they met the Blades again in the 1985 finals with the Thunderbirds defeating them in six games to win their second league championship. Watson led the league in assists during the playoffs with 14 while Brian Carroll was awarded the ACHL Playoff MVP award for his 11 goals and 9 assists. In the 1985–86 season, the team had a 49–14–0 record. Center Joe Curran, scored 42 goals and league best 82 assists for a total of 124 points, was awarded the team's second ACHL MVP after the season. Goaltender Ray LeBlanc was a first team selection to the ACHL All-Star team and Irving was a second team selection. Dave Watson, who only played in nine games during the season, played in his last playoffs as he would retire after the season. In the 1986 finals, the Thunderbirds and Blades faced off for the third time, with the Thunderbirds winning in five games to become the only team to win consecutive ACHL championships. Bob Doré was awarded the ACHL Playoff MVP award.

After winning three championships in four years, Dudley moved up to become the head coach of the Flint Spirits in the International Hockey League and former Thunderbird player Mark Huglen was hired as the new coach. Huglen was unable to get the same results and after a poor 12–16 record to start the season, including 11 straight losses, he was replaced by another former Thunderbird player, Pierre Hamel. The team finished the season 23–31–2 with 48 points, enough for the fourth seed in the playoffs. The team lost in the semifinals to the Virginia Lancers in five games. Despite the team's down year, the Thunderbird's Doug McCarthy led the league in both assists and points and Scott Knutson was awarded with the ACHL Rookie Of The Year.

In 1987, the ACHL merged into the All-American Hockey League (AAHL). Hamel started the season as head coach but was replaced by another former Thunderbird player, Brian Carroll, mid-season. The Thunderbirds went on to finish second in the standings with a 34–15–0 record, 68 points, and seven points behind the first place Virginia Lancers. John Torchetti set season records with 63 goals scored and 134 points and was a first team AAHL All-Star. Torchetti also was named the AAHL MVP after the season. In the AAHL playoffs, the Thunderbirds won the championship series over the Lancers in their only season in the AAHL.

The team was one of the founding five teams to form the East Coast Hockey League (ECHL) in the 1988. Bill Coffey sold the team to minority owner John Baker during the season. On October 28, 1988 the Thunderbirds played at the Johnstown Chiefs in the first game in ECHL history. The team's 1988–89 regular season was mediocre and the team went through four different head coaches. Incumbent head coach Brian Carroll was replaced early in the season by Joe Selenski. Keith McAdams then filled in as head coach for one game before the team hired Brendon Watson as head coach on February 19 with only 13 games left in the season. Watson coached the team to 8 wins in the final 13 games before the playoffs. The team struggled on defense during the regular season, with a 5.48 goals against average (GAA) per game. With a 27–32–1 record, the team finished in fourth place in the five team league. As the fourth seed, the Thunderbirds swept the regular season champion Erie Panthers in four games. In the inaugural ECHL championships, the Thunderbirds faced the Johnstown Chiefs. The Thunderbirds lost game one at the Chiefs 8–1 as the Chiefs scored four power play goals during the game. After losing the first two games by a combined score of 14–2 in Johnstown, the Thunderbirds won the next three games to take a series lead 3–2, putting the Thunderbirds one win away from the title. Game two had a combined 186 penalty minutes between the teams. During the series, the ice at Winston-Salem Coliseum melted prior to game four because a compressor shut down during the night. The originally scheduled game five in Johnstown became game four and the Thunderbirds hosted game five back at home. The Chiefs' Tom Sasso scored two shorthand goals to help his team even the series in game six by defeating the Thunderbirds 7–4, a game that included several fights. After the game, in an effort to protect the league's image, ECHL commissioner Pat Kelly suspended three (Steve Plakson, Bill Huard and Michael Lanouette) of the Thunderbirds' players. As a result, the Thunderbirds were forced to face the Chiefs in the seventh and deciding game with just 11 skaters. Coach Watson used a plan of changing personal on every whistle during game seven to slow down the pace of the game and buy as much rest for the few players he had available as possible. In spite of this set back, in the final game of the series, The Thunderbirds beat the Chiefs 7–4 to win the first ECHL Championship, and were awarded the Riley Cup for the season. Goaltender Nick Vitucci was named the Most Valuable Player for the playoffs. In the series, John Devereaux and E.J. Sauer lead the Thunderbirds in goals with five each, Bob Wensley lead the team with eight assists, and Randy Irving lead the team with nine points from three goals and six assists. , three Thunderbirds' players still held the top three spots for the ECHL record for the most penalty minutes in a finals series from that year; Steve Plaskon with 95, Michel Lanouette with 68 and Bill Huard with 58. Six Thunderbirds scored one power play goal each and Sauer scored the team's only short–handed goal, during game three, of the series.

In 1989, the team name changed back to the Winston-Salem Thunderbirds. The team also began playing at the new Winston-Salem Fairgrounds Annex after the old Winston-Salem Memorial Coliseum was demolished. Chris McSorley was hired to replace Brendon Watson as head coach before the season, McSorley's first experience as head coach. McSorley led the Thunderbirds to the top of the ECHL standings before a power struggle between him and general manager Jay Fraser led to Fraser replacing McSorley as head coach for the remainder of the season. Len Soccio, Joe Ferras and Trent Kaese all finished in the top four of the league scoring, while goaltenders Paul Cohen and Kenton Rein both finished the season in the top five for goals against average (GAA) in the league. The team finished as regular season champions with a 38–16–7 record and 82 points. The team was awarded the Henry Brabham Cup trophy, given regular season champions. The team defeated the Nashville Knights in five games to reach the finals. In the finals, the team faced their in-state rival Greensboro Monarchs. The teams split the first two games in Winston-Salem, with a 5–3 Greensboro win in game one and a 6–3 win for the Thunderbirds in game two. Game two had a combined 226 penalty minutes between the teams breaking the record from the year before. Greensboro won 5–1 at home in game three. Game four, also in Greensboro, went into double overtime time with the Monarchs winning. Game four was the longest game in ECHL finals history up to that point, but has since been surpassed. Each team had 67 shots on goal in the game for a 134 total, all of which are ECHL finals records . Monarchs' goaltender, Wade Flaherty, made 64 saves as the Thunderbird's goaltender, Kenton Rein, had 63 saves. The series returned to Winston-Salem, but the Thunderbirds lost game five and the championship four-games-to-one. During the finals series, the Thunderbirds were led by Troy Vollhoffer with four goals, Dave Doucette and Len Soccio with five assists each, while Soccio also lead the team with seven points. John Torchetti scored the team's only power play goal (during game four) and Vollhoffer had two of the team's three short-handed goals. Soccio was the ECHL playoffs scoring leader with 17 points. Irving retired after the season as the team leader in seasons with the team, all-time games played and all-time postseason assists, and as one of the only two players with the Thunderbirds to play in all five playoffs championships.

The following 1990–91 season, the league was aligned to include two separate divisions, East and West. The Thunderbirds were placed in the West Division, posted a record of 20–41–3 and failed to make the playoffs for the first time. Fraser stepped down as head coach mid-season to return to only general manager duties and Marcel Comeau, previously the head coach of the New Haven Nighthawks of the American Hockey League before being let go earlier in the season, was named as his replacement. The team placed in the East Division the following season. Doug Sauter was hired as the new head coach before the 1991–92 season and improved the team to a third-place finish in the East Division with a 36–24–4 record, winning the ECHL Coach of the Year award. Goaltender Frédéric Chabot led the league with the best goals against average (GAA) during the season at 2.94 per game. In the playoffs, the Thunderbirds lost to the Richmond Renegades in the first round in five games.

After the end of the 1991–92 season, it was announced by co-owner Ed Broyhill that Winston-Salem would move to West Virginia to play as the Wheeling Thunderbirds.

Season-by-season results

Head coaches 
 Curry Whittaker 1981–82
 Rick Dudley 1982–86
 Mark Huglen 1986–87
 Pierre Hamel 1986–88 (midseason replacement of Huglen)
 Brian Carroll 1987–89 (midseason replacement of Hamel)
 Joe Selenski 1988–89 (midseason replacement of Carroll)
 Keith McAdams 1988–89 (midseason one game replacement of Selenski)
 Brendon Watson 1988–89 (midseason replacement of McAdams)
 Chris McSorley 1989–90
 Jay Fraser 1989–91 (midseason replacement of McSorley)
 Marcel Comeau 1990–91 (midseason replacement of Fraser)
 Doug Sauter 1991–92

Championships 
1982–83: ACHL regular season champions
1982–83: ACHL playoff champions
1983–84: ACHL regular season champions
1984–85: ACHL regular season champions
1984–85: ACHL playoff champions
1985–86: ACHL regular season champions
1985–86: ACHL playoff champions
1987–88: AAHL playoff champions
1988–89: ECHL playoff champions (Riley Cup)
1989–90: ECHL regular season champions

Awards

All-Stars

ACHL All-Stars
 1982–83: Dave Watson (1st team)
 1982–83: Michel Lanouette, Forward (1st team)
 1982–83: Brian Carroll, Forward (2nd team)
 1982–83: Randy Irving, Defense (2nd team)
 1983–84: Pierre Hamel, Goaltender (1st team)  
 1983–84: Randy Irving, Defense (1st team)
 1984–85: Bob Hagan (1st team)
 1984–85: Randy Irving, Defense (1st team)
 1985–86: Ray LeBlanc, Goaltender (1st team)
 1985–86: Randy Irving, Defense (2nd team)

AAHL All-Stars
 1987-88: John Torchetti (1st team)

ECHL All-Stars
 1988-89: Frank Lattuca, Defense
 1989–90: Trent Kaese, Forward (1st team) 
 1989–90: Len Soccio, Forward (1st team)
 1989–90: Dave Doucette, Defense (1st team)
 1989–90: Joe Ferras, Forward (2nd team)
 1991–92: Marc Laniel,  Defense (2nd team)

MVP

ACHL MVP
 1982–83: Rory Cava
 1985–86: Joe Curran

AAHL MVP
 1987-88: John Torchetti

ACHL Playoff MVP
 1984–85: Brian Carroll
 1985–86: Bob Doré

Riley Cup Playoffs MVP
 1989: Nick Vitucci, Goaltender

Rookie Of The Year
ACHL Rookie Of The Year
 1986–87: Scott Knutson

Coach of the Year
ECHL John Brophy Award 
 1991–92: Doug Sauter

ECHL Player of the Week
1988–89
 11/16–11/22: John Devereaux
 11/29-12/6: Brian Hannon
 3/1–3/7: Bill Huard
 3/15–3/21: Nick Vitucci
 3/15–3/21: Steve Plaskon
 3/15–3/21: Scott Rettew
 3/15–3/21: John Torchetti
 3/22–3/27: Nick Vitucci
 3/22–3/27: John Torchetti
 4/5–4/14: Nick Vitucci

Regular season champions
 1982–1983: Carolina Thunderbirds
 1983–1984: Carolina Thunderbirds
 1984–1985: Carolina Thunderbirds
 1985–1986: Carolina Thunderbirds
 1989–1990: Winston-Salem Thunderbirds

Bob Payne Trophy winners
 1982–83: Carolina Thunderbirds
 1984–85: Carolina Thunderbirds
 1985–86: Carolina Thunderbirds

Jack Riley Cup winners
 1989: Carolina Thunderbirds

Henry Brabham Cup winners
 1989–90: Winston-Salem Thunderbirds

Notable players
 Scott Allen — A center who played in 106 games with the Thunderbirds from 1986 to 1990. During the 1988–89 season he played slightly under fourteen minutes as a goaltender for the Thunderbirds. He has also been an assistant coach for the New York Islanders. 
 Rick Brebant — Started his professional career by playing for the Thunderbirds in the 1987–88 season. He is a member of the British Ice Hockey Hall of Fame.
 Brian Carroll — Played in 308 games for the Thunderbirds from their inaugural season in 1981 until 1986. He holds the all-time postseason record for goals, 27, and points, 45. He won the 1984–85 ACHL Playoff MVP Award. After retiring he served as the head coach for the Thunderbirds from 1987 to 1989. He won three championships as a player with the Thunderbirds and another Championship as head coach of the team in 1988.
 Rory Cava — Played for the Thunderbirds during the 1982–83 and 1984–85 seasons. He won the ACHL MVP during his first season with the team. Both of his seasons with the team ended with playoff championships.
 Frédéric Chabot — 1991–92 member of Thunderbirds. Played parts of five seasons in the NHL for the Montreal Canadiens, Philadelphia Flyers, and Los Angeles Kings. Holds the NHL record as the most selected player in expansion drafts, tied with Darren Puppa who was drafted twice in the same year.
 Joe Curran — A three-time champion with the Thunderbirds who played 178 games with the team from 1984 to 1988. He won the ACHL MVP Award for the 1985–86 season. Holds the team record from most assists during a season with 82 in the 1985–86 season and goals scored in a postseason with 12 in 1986.
 Kevin Dahl — Played in the NHL with the Calgary Flames, Phoenix Coyotes, Toronto Maple Leafs, and Columbus Blue Jackets. 1990–91 member of Thunderbirds.
 Jeff Eatough — Played the 1987–88 season with Thunderbirds. Drafted in the fourth round, 80th overall, by the Buffalo Sabres in the 1981 NHL Entry Draft. He played in the National Hockey League with the Sabres as an 18-year-old during the 1981–82 season.
 Keith Gretzky — One of the brothers of ice hockey legend Wayne Gretzky. He was taken in the third round of the 1985 NHL Entry Draft by the Buffalo Sabres. Played with the Thunderbirds during the 1990–91 season.
 Pierre Hamel — A goaltender who played in the National Hockey League for the Toronto Maple Leafs and Winnipeg Jets. He played in 90 games for Thunderbirds from 1983 to 1985 and was an ACHL First Team All-Star in 1984–85 season before retiring after that season. After retiring, he later became the head coach of Thunderbirds from 1986 to 1988.
 Paul Higgins — Drafted 200th overall by the Toronto Maple Leafs in 1981 out of high school, he was called up for a few games with the Maple Leafs late in the 1981–82 season and then played 22 games the next season. He played in one game of the Norris Division semifinal versus the Minnesota North Stars that year. He had injuries and discipline issues on and off the ice throughout most of his career. He played in four games for the Thunderbirds in 1983–84 season before retiring.
 Bill Huard — Played with Thunderbirds in 1988–89 season. In his 40 games, he scored 27 goals and 21 assists for 48 points and earned 177 penalty minutes. He had a professional career of over 600 games, including parts of seven seasons at the NHL level with the Boston Bruins, Ottawa Senators, Quebec Nordiques, Dallas Stars, Edmonton Oilers, and Los Angeles Kings.
 Randy Irving — A defencemen who played the most seasons with the Thunderbirds. Played in 428 all-time games for the team from their inaugural season in 1981 until 1990. Holds all of the Thunderbirds records for games played with the team during the regular season and postseason and is the all-time postseason assists leader for the team. One of only two players to play on all five playoffs championship teams with the Thunderbirds.
 Brian Johnson — Played in three games for Detroit Red Wings in 1983–84. He played in 22 games for the Thunderbirds during the 1985–86 season before retiring after that season.
 Trent Kaese — Drafted in the eighth round, 161st overall, by the Buffalo Sabres in the 1985 NHL Entry Draft and played in the NHL with the Sabres during the 1988–89 season. Played the 1989–90 season with Thunderbirds and was an ECHL First Team All-Star.
 Michel Lanouette — Played with Thunderbirds from 1982 to 1989 and again during the 1990–91 season. Holds the Thunderbirds record for Penalty minutes All-time during the regular season, postseason and all-time. One of only two players to play on all five playoffs championship teams with the Thunderbirds.
 Ray LeBlanc — A goaltender who played with Thunderbirds during the 1985–86 season. Appeared in one NHL game for the Chicago Blackhawks during the 1991–92 season and appeared in all eight games for the United States in the 1992 Winter Olympics, compiling a record of 5–2–1 with two shutouts for the US.
 Alan May — Played the 1986–87 season for the Thunderbirds, but scored 23 goals, 14 assists, and 310 penalty minutes in 42 games before being signed by the Boston Bruins after the season. Played in 393 NHL games during his eight NHL seasons with the Boston Bruins, Edmonton Oilers, Washington Capitals, Dallas Stars, and Calgary Flames between 1988 and 1995. He scored 31 goals, 45 assists, and accumulated 1,333 penalty minutes in the NHL.
 Bill Morris — Played with Thunderbirds during the 1981–82 season and from 1983 to 1985. Played 36 games in the World Hockey Association with the Edmonton Oilers during 1974–75 season. He also played for the former Winston-Salem Polar Twins in the 1970s.
 Victor Posa —  Drafted 137th overall by the Chicago Black Hawks in the 1985 NHL Entry Draft and played for them in the 1985–86 season. Member of Thunderbirds from 1989 to 1991.
 Darren Schwartz — Member of Thunderbirds during their last season in Winston-Salem before relocating with team. Played 490 games in the East Coast Hockey League and was inducted into the ECHL Hall of Fame in 2013. 
 Paul Skidmore — A goaltender who played the 1983–84 season for the Thunderbirds. Played in the National Hockey League for the St. Louis Blues.
 Doug Smith — A member of the 1988–89 championship Thunderbirds team, co-wrote the book Goon: The True Story of an Unlikely Journey into Minor League Hockey, which was adapted into the motion picture Goon, and a sequel, Goon: Last of the Enforcers. Smith is portrayed in both movies by the actor Seann William Scott as Doug Glatt.
 John Torchetti — A member of the Thunderbirds from 1984 to 1991, later became the head coach of the NHL's Florida Panthers and Los Angeles Kings. Holds many of the Thunderbirds records for goals scored, assists and points.
 Nick Vitucci — Goaltender who played the 1988–89 and 1989–90 seasons with the Thunderbirds, winning the Finals Most Valuable Player with the team in 1989. Inducted into the ECHL Hall of Fame in 2008.
 Dave Watson — Played with Thunderbirds from 1982 to 1986. Played in the National Hockey League for the Colorado Rockies. He holds the team record for most assists during a postseason with 14 in 1985.

Franchise leaders
All-time and season leaders:

All-time regular season
Games played: Randy Irving, 357
Goals scored: John Torchetti, 237
Assists: John Torchetti, 254
Points: John Torchetti, 491
Penalty minutes: Michel Lanouette, 945
Seasons played: Randy Irving, 9 (1981–82 season to 1989–90 season)

All-time postseason
Games played: Randy Irving, 71
Goals scored: Brian Carroll, 27
Assists: Randy Irving, 45
Points: Brian Carroll, 59
Penalty minutes: Michel Lanouette, 235
Playoff seasons played: Randy Irving, 8 (1982–1986, 1988–1990 playoffs)
Consecutive playoff seasons: Brian Carroll, 5 (1982–1986 playoffs); Randy Irving, 5 (1982–1986 playoffs); and John Torchetti, 5 (1985–1990 playoffs)
Postseason Championships as a player: Randy Irving and Michel Lanouette, 5 (1983, 1985, and 1986 ACHL champions; 1988 AAHL champions; 1989 ECHL champions)
Postseason Championships as head coach: Rick Dudley, 3 (1983, 1985, and 1986 ACHL champions)

All-time (including regular season & postseason)
Games played: Randy Irving, 428
Goals scored: John Torchetti, 261
Assists: John Torchetti, 284
Points: John Torchetti, 545
Penalty minutes: Michel Lanouette, 1,180

Season records
Goals scored: John Torchetti, 63 (1987–88)
Assists: Joe Curran, 82 (1985–86)
Points: John Torchetti, 134 (1987–88)
Penalty minutes: Brian Gustafson, 354 (1983–84)

Postseason records
Goals scored: Joe Curran, 12 (1986)
Assists: Dave Watson, 14 (1985)
Points: Andy Cozzi, 21 (1986)
Penalty minutes: Steve Plaskon, 132 (1989)

Attendance
Average per game:
1981–82: 1,973
1989–90: 2,620
1990–91: 1,837
1991–92: 2,114

References

All-American Hockey League teams
Defunct ECHL teams
Ice hockey teams in North Carolina
Sports in the Piedmont Triad
Sports in Winston-Salem, North Carolina
Defunct sports teams in North Carolina